Emily Kim (born Kim Kwang-sook; ; born 1957), commonly known as Maangchi, is a South Korean-born American YouTuber and author. She is notable for producing cooking videos centered around Korean cuisine. She was described by The New York Times as "YouTube's Korean Julia Child.".

Life 
Kim was born in Yeosu, South Korea. Her family was involved in the seafood industry, and Kim learned how to cook from her female relatives.

In 1992, Kim and her husband moved to Columbia, Missouri, where Kim worked as a teacher. In Missouri, she found the quality, variety, and availability of Korean food to be lacking, and so she often cooked for other members of the local Korean-American community. She immigrated to Toronto, Canada in 2002.

In 2003, she and her husband divorced, and with her two fully-grown children out of the house, Kim started playing MMO City of Heroes using the character name Maangchi, meaning "Hammer" in Korean. After this and up until 2007, Kim worked as a family counselor for a nonprofit organization.

Culinary career 
Kim was introduced to YouTube's online cooking scene in 2007, inspiring her to begin making videos about Korean food, using the channel name "Maangchi". Her channel quickly grew in popularity, attributed to her upbeat attitude and her strict adherence to traditional Korean recipes. Along with her cooking videos on Youtube, Kim also runs a website at maangchi.com that includes a request section and discussion board for fans, along with additional photos and a podcast. In 2013, Kim worked together with Top Chef winner Kristen Kish on a PBS program called Lucky Chow, where she gave Kish a cooking lesson in traditional Korean cuisine that focused on kimchi and japchae. 

Prompted by her YouTube channel's success, Kim published her first cookbook in 2015, titled Maangchi's Real Korean Cooking. Her second cookbook named Maangchi's Big Book of Korean Cooking was made with co-author Martha Rose Shulman and published by Rux Martin in 2019. The book discusses recipes alongside how to use certain cooking utensils and a picture guide to Korean ingredients. In March 2018, the South Korean Ministry of Agriculture, Food and Rural Affairs announced it would be collaborating with Kim and her brand to better showcase Korean foods to North American consumers.

As of August 2022, Kim's YouTube channel has 6.06 million subscribers.

Bibliography

References 

Living people
American YouTubers
American chefs
Chefs of Korean cuisine
Food and cooking YouTubers
People from Yeosu
South Korean chefs
South Korean emigrants to the United States
1957 births